The 1971–72 FIBA Women's European Cup Winners' Cup, running from November 1971 to March 1972, was the inaugural edition of FIBA Europe's second-tier competition for women's basketball clubs, subsequently renamed Ronchetti Cup. The competition system was similar to that of the FIBA Women's European Champions Cup back then.

Spartak Leningrad won the first of four titles in a row beating ŽKK Voždovac in the final.

Qualifying round

Round of 8

Group stage

Group A

Group B

Semifinals

Final

References

1971-72
1971–72 in European women's basketball